"The Pretender" is a song by the American alternative rock band Foo Fighters. It was the first single from the group's 2007 album Echoes, Silence, Patience & Grace. It is one of Foo Fighters' most successful songs; peaking at number 37 on the US Billboard Hot 100 (making it their third top-40 single), only "Learn to Fly" and "Best of You" beat its position on the Billboard Hot 100.

Composition
Dave Grohl first showcased the song, which had the working title "Silver Heart", during pre-production of Echoes, Silence, Patience & Grace, but the song did not see much development. According to producer Gil Norton, "The chorus was there, but the verse and the middle hadn't been written. Not to mention the song was much slower." During a 10-day break from recordings in April 2007, Grohl listened to the monitor mixes and thought that the record needed another uptempo song, so he spent his time developing "Silver Heart". The band then recorded a demo for "The Pretender", which Norton approved, leading to the song getting a proper recording the following day.

Grohl described "The Pretender" as "a stomping Foo Fighters uptempo song, with a little bit of Chuck Berry in it."
The song is written in the key of A minor and showcases the shifting dynamics which Grohl wanted to employ on Echoes, Silence, Patience & Grace, starting with a very stripped-down introduction, featuring soft guitar and vocals along with a small string section. Then comes an escalating hard rock sound, interrupted by breakdowns and escalations in the bridge, including a repeat of the intro. Mixing engineer Rich Costey stated that making all these dynamics work, as well as balancing the instruments, was challenging, as Grohl and drummer Taylor Hawkins always want more focus on their instruments. The amount of guitar overdubs also worried Costey – "The guitars on 'The Pretender' are quite full on, with countermelodies and so forth, and they all tend to be in the same range, so it gets quite dense. The challenge of this type of mix is to retain the power of the track, yet define a space for everything. Handling the guitar balance was a slight chore, and in comparison the drums and vocals were quite easy."

Grohl has said that the Sesame Street song "One of These Things (Is Not Like the Others)" may have subconsciously influenced his writing of the song.

Meaning
In a 2007 interview with XFM, frontman Dave Grohl stopped short of explaining the meaning behind "The Pretender", but alluded its roots go to political unrest of the time it was written. Grohl noted: "That's the thing with lyrics, you never want to give away specifics, because it's nice for people to have their own idea or interpretation of the song. But, you know, everyone's been fucked over before and I think a lot of people feel fucked over right now and they're not getting what they were promised, and so something to do with that."

Grohl also told XFM "The Pretender" was not initially planned for the album and happened really quickly:

That song didn't happen until later on in the session. We didn't go into making the record with that song and it happened after we recorded a lot of stuff. Up until that point, I didn't know if we had a good opening song or not. So after we recorded it, I thought, "oh this is perfect, we have the song to open the record," and it just became everybody's favorite song.... It's the type of song that I look forward to opening shows with and it came together really easily... We put that song together in, I don't know, a day, whereas a lot of the other songs we worked on for weeks.

Personnel
Dave Grohl – lead vocals, rhythm guitar
Chris Shiflett – lead guitar
Nate Mendel – bass
Taylor Hawkins – drums, backing vocals
The Section Quartet – string section, arranged by Audrey Riley

Reception
This song was number 47 on Rolling Stones list of the 100 Best Songs of 2007. The song was a 2008 Grammy Award nominee for Best Rock Song and Record of the Year. It won the Grammy for Best Hard Rock Performance the same year. This song was also number 94 on MTV Asias list of Top 100 Hits of 2007. The music video was nominated for a 2008 MTV Video Music Award for Best Rock Video, but lost to Linkin Park's "Shadow of the Day".

This album was the fourth consecutive Foo Fighters album to have a song reach the top of the U.S. Hot Modern Rock Tracks chart. "The Pretender" was the most densely played alternative rock song of 2007. It held the record for longest running number 1 in the Modern Rock Tracks' history, beating a then-record of 16 weeks by Red Hot Chili Peppers' "Scar Tissue", Staind's "It's Been Awhile", and Green Day's "Boulevard of Broken Dreams", with 18 weeks at number 1, until Muse's "Madness" reigned for 19 weeks in 2012–13, but that later got eclipsed by Portugal. The Man's "Feel It Still" in 2017 which spent 20 weeks at the number 1 spot. It also spent 6 weeks at number 1 on the Hot Mainstream Rock Tracks chart. It made the Triple J's Hottest 100 in Australia, placing in at number 5.

Music video
The music video was directed by Sam Brown. It is presented in letterbox format and heavily employs pans, zooms, and tracking shots. It consists of the band performing the song in an airplane hangar with many strip lights on the ceiling. Behind the band is a large red screen, which is thick and solid. The band is then faced by what appears to be a riot police officer, who stands behind a black line in front of the band. As the song progresses, he is joined by more riot police officers who line up at the same black line. Panning left-to-right across this lineup, each police officer is seen to have a number on his chest, which are in order counting down, hinting at a buildup toward the approaching climax. As the quieter bridge begins, the video slows down and the officers charge the band. Just as the band begins the song's louder chorus, the screen suddenly explodes and a red liquid erupts from it, overwhelming the police officers, but affecting the band to a lesser extent. At the end of the video, Dave Grohl is shown slamming his guitar on the floor as he falls to his knees. The visual effects in the video were done by Mechnology Visual Effects in Burbank, California.

As of September 2022, the song has over 510 million views on YouTube, making it the band's most viewed video on the platform.

Track listing
2-track CD
"The Pretender"
"If Ever"

Maxi CD
"The Pretender" – 4:31
"Come Alive" (Demo) – 5:31
"If Ever" – 4:15
"Monkey Wrench" (Live from Hyde Park video) – 5:35

7"
"The Pretender"
"Bangin'"

Charts and certifications

Weekly charts

Year-end charts

Certifications

Releases
The song was made available to download on May 10, 2011, for use in the Rock Band 3 music gaming platform in both Basic rhythm, and PRO mode which takes advantage of the use of a real guitar / bass guitar, along with standard MIDI-compatible electronic drum kits in addition to vocals.

References

2007 singles
Foo Fighters songs
Grammy Award for Best Hard Rock Performance
Song recordings produced by Gil Norton
2007 songs
RCA Records singles
Songs written by Dave Grohl
Songs written by Taylor Hawkins
Songs written by Nate Mendel
Songs written by Chris Shiflett